Michael John Kozlowski (born February 24, 1956) is a former American professional football player. He was a safety for the Miami Dolphins (1979–86). Kozlowski was a tailback at Colorado (1977–78) before switching to defense with the Dolphins. Mike's brother, Glen Kozlowski played wide receiver at BYU and for six years (1987–1992) with the Chicago Bears. Kozlowski's father is Polish and his mother is Samoan and Hawaiian.

References

1956 births
Living people
American people of Polish descent
American sportspeople of Samoan descent
Native Hawaiian people
Players of American football from Newark, New Jersey
American football defensive backs
Colorado Buffaloes football players
Miami Dolphins players